Peter King (5 July 1964 – 23 February 2012) was an English footballer who played as a midfielder for Crewe Alexandra in the Football League.

Playing career
King was a youth player at Liverpool, but left Anfield when he signed for Fourth Division club Crewe Alexandra in the summer of 1983; he was actually not signed by new manager Dario Gradi, as the Alex board acted on the recommendation of Liverpool and former Alex secretary Peter Robinson. He went on to make 64 appearances for the "Railwaymen" during the 1983–84 and 1984–85 campaigns, scoring five goals. He later played non-league football for Southport in the Northern Premier League in 1985–86 and 1986–87, before joining league rivals Morecambe.
King played mainly as a defensive midfielder, but could also perform at left or right full back. He was also a very good penalty taker.

References

1964 births
2012 deaths
Footballers from Liverpool
English footballers
Association football midfielders
Crewe Alexandra F.C. players
Southport F.C. players
Morecambe F.C. players
English Football League players